The Albany Transit System is the primary provider of mass transportation in Dougherty County, Georgia. Buses run along ten local routes from Monday through Saturday.

Routes
1 Jackson Heights
1X Turner
2 Albany State
3 Albany Mall
4 East Albany
4X Cooper
5 Brooks Plaza 
6 Darton College
7 Newton/Oakridge
8 MLK

Roster

See also

External links
 City of Albany, GA - Transit

Albany, Georgia
Bus transportation in Georgia (U.S. state)
Transportation in Dougherty County, Georgia
Transit agencies in Georgia (U.S. state)